Konstantin Sarajev (Constantine Saradjian) (1877–1954) was a Soviet Armenian conductor and violinist.

He graduated from the Moscow Conservatory, then continued his musical training in Prague with O.Shevchik. In Thessalonica, Sarajian conducted popular symphonic concerts (1908–1910) and directed the Sergievo-Alekseievski National Opera's symphony orchestra (1911–12). Saradjian worked as an opera and symphony orchestra conductor, directed the Moscow Institute of Theater (1922–24), and was the Moscow Conservatory Professor (1922–35). He conducted the Moscow Amateur symphonic orchestra and from 1935 to 1939 he was the conductor of the Armenian Opera & Ballet Theater.

Since 1936 Sarajian was a Professor and President of Yerevan State Conservatory.

From 1941 to 1945 he was the artistic director and principal conductor of the Armenian Philharmonic Orchestra. Besides the classical repertoire Sarajian widely promoted the works of Miaskovski, Prokofiev and new symphonic pieces of young composers. He was People's Artist of the Soviet Armenia in 1945.

Konstantin and Zoya Sarajevs are buried at Yerevan's Central Cemetery, his memorial is a unique work of Art made of basalt stone.

References

External links
Saradjian

Armenian musicians
Armenian pianists
Armenian music
1954 deaths
1877 births
Expatriates from the Russian Empire in the Ottoman Empire
Conductors (music) from the Russian Empire